Alan Murchison is a former Michelin-starred Scottish chef and restaurateur, living in England.

Career
Murchison started his kitchen career as a kitchen porter, aged 14. Like most chefs, he worked in a number of restaurants, learning and promoting along the way. He had stints in Claridges, Inverlochy Castle, Le Manoir aux Quat'Saisons, L'Ortolan and Nobu. In 1999, he became director of the cookery school of Le Manoir aux Quat'Saisons.

Murchison returned to L'Ortolan in 2001 this time as head chef. In 2003, the restaurant was awarded a Michelin star. Two years later he left to take up a position as executive head chef at Chewton Glen hotel in New Milton, Hampshire. He left three months later. After a few minor consultancy jobs, Murchison rejoined L'ortolan in September 2004, this time as director-executive head chef with an option to buy the restaurant.

In 2007, Murchison jumped on the opportunity to buy the former Hibiscus restaurant in Ludlow, Shropshire from Claude Bosi. He reopened the place as La Bécasse.

Later, Murchison founded "Alan Murchison Restaurants Ltd.", later restyled as the 10 in 8 Fine Dining Group. The general idea behind it was:

The group now includes four restaurants and a cookery school.

Alan Murchison acquired Paris House in late 2009. The Woburn, Bedfordshire-based restaurant was bought out of the legacy of Peter Chandler, who died earlier in 2009.

Murchison also acted as mentor for the Nestlé Toque d'Or student catering competition 2010. In Murchison's opinion it is "to give something back, having benefited from strong mentorship early in his career."

In 2010, Murchison added the New Angel restaurant to his "10 in 8 Fine Dining Group". He had the plan to reopen is with its original name Carved Angels, but found out that was impossible due to trademark issues. At the end, the restaurant reopened as Angélique.

Murchison appeared on a BBC series Great British Menu. He lost to Tom Kitchin in 2009 in the Scotland heats. He won the Scotland heats in 2010 and 2012 but did not win the finals. In 2011, Murchison reappeared on Great British Menu once as a judge for the Scottish heats.

In November 2013, Alan Murchison Restaurants was liquidated, leaving more than fifty creditors with unpaid amount of  owed by the group. In 2014, Paris House and 10 in 8 also fell into liquidation. Later that same year, Murchison resigned as executive chef of L'Ortolan.

Book
 Food for Thought, 2007
 The Cycling Chef, 2019

Personal
Murchison is married to Fiona and has four children.
He is a talented amateur cyclist and duathlete, becoming World and European sprint duathlon champion in his age group in 2013, 2014 and 2015 at championships held in Horst, the Netherlands; Ottawa, Canada; and Pontevedra, Spain.

References

External links
 

Living people
Scottish chefs
Scottish television chefs
Scottish food writers
British restaurateurs
Scottish non-fiction writers
Scottish businesspeople
1971 births
Head chefs of Michelin starred restaurants
People from Inverness